Farishta Ya Qatil is a 1977 Bollywood action film directed by S.M. Abbas. The film stars Shashi Kapoor and Rekha.

Cast
Shashi Kapoor   
Rekha   
Jayshree T.   
Yunus Parvez   
Utpal Dutt   
Bindu   
Sujit Kumar   
Mac Mohan   
Prem Nath   
Om Shivpuri   
Johnny Walker

Soundtrack
All songs are written by Anjaan.

External links
 

1977 films
1970s Hindi-language films
1977 action films
Films scored by Kalyanji Anandji
Indian action drama films
Hindi-language action films